The Country Studies are works published by the Federal Research Division of the United States Library of Congress, freely available for use by researchers.  No copyright is claimed on them. Therefore, they have been dedicated to the public domain and can be copied freely, though not all the pictures used therein are in the public domain. The Country Studies Series presents a description and analysis of the historical setting and the social, economic, political, and national security systems and institutions of countries throughout the world. The series examines the interrelationships of those systems and the ways they are shaped by cultural factors.

The books represent the analysis of the authors and should not be construed as an expression of an official United States Government position, policy, or decision. The authors have sought to adhere to accepted standards of scholarly objectivity. 

Online information contained in the online Country Studies is not copyrighted and thus is available for free and unrestricted use by researchers. As a courtesy, however, appropriate credit should be given to the series. The material may be copied into Wikipedia, but its plagiarism rule requires explicit credit be given.

Hard-copy editions of all books in the series (except the regional studies on Macau and Afghanistan) can be ordered from the Superintendent of Documents, U.S. Government Publishing Office at the U.S. Government Bookstore.

The last appropriation for the program was in fiscal year 2004. In response to this one-time infusion "...the Federal Research Division initiated action to produce five new Country Studies, as well as a number of shorter, updated Country Profiles. All of that work continues, but in the absence of renewed funding ... no additional work can be initiated."

Countries with published studies 
This is a list of countries for which studies are available at LOCCS, not links to such studies. 

Afghanistan
Albania
Algeria
Angola
Armenia
Austria
Azerbaijan
Bahrain
Bangladesh
Belarus
Belize
Bhutan
Bolivia
Brazil
Bulgaria 1974 Area Handbook; 1992 Country Study;
Cambodia
Caribbean Islands
Chad
Chile
China
Colombia
Comoros
Ivory Coast
Cyprus
Czechoslovakia (former)
Dominican Republic
Ecuador
Egypt
El Salvador
Estonia
Ethiopia
Finland
Georgia
Germany
Germany, East (former)
Ghana
Guyana
Haiti
Honduras
Hungary
India
Indonesia
Iran (also Army Area Handbooks 1964, 1971)
Iraq
Israel
Italy
Japan
Jordan
Kazakhstan
Kuwait
Kyrgyzstan
Latvia
Laos
Lebanon
Liberia—country study 1985, earlier editions 1960s, 1970s
Libya
Lithuania
Macau
Madagascar
Maldives
Mauritania
Mauritius
Mexico
Moldova
Mongolia
Nepal
Nicaragua
Nigeria
North Korea
Oman
Pakistan
Panama
Paraguay
Peru
Philippines
Poland
Portugal
Qatar
Romania 1972 Area Handbook
Russia
Rwanda (Army Area Handbook 1968)
Saudi Arabia
Seychelles
Singapore
Somalia
South Africa
South Korea
South Vietnam (former)
Soviet Union (former)
Spain
Sri Lanka
Sudan
Syria
Tajikistan
Thailand
Turkmenistan
Turkey
Uganda
United Arab Emirates
Uruguay
Uzbekistan
Venezuela
Vietnam
Yugoslavia (former)
Zaire (former)

See also
The World Factbook

References

External links
 Country Studies online at the Library of Congress
 Country Studies 

Country Studies
Reports of the United States government